HNLMS Harlingen (M843) is the eighth ship in the City / Vlissingen-class mine countermeasures vessels, and fourth to be built for the Royal Netherlands Navy.

See also
 Future of the Royal Netherlands Navy

References

Minehunters of the Netherlands